Cirrhilabrus pylei, commonly called the blue-margin fairy-wrasse or Pyle's wrasse, is a species of fairy wrasse. C. pylei can be kept in aquariums and is known for its peaceful temperament. The fish has also been known to jump from tanks.

Description 
The species has 11 dorsal spines, nine dorsal soft rays, 3 anal spines, and 9 anal soft rays. The species has a coloration of peach to salmon. Until 2020, it was commonly confused with C. briangreenei of the Philippines; the most distinct differences are that adult males of C. briangreenei have a large blackish spot on the dorsal fin and a blackish tip of the tail, which are lacking in C. pylei.

Behavior 
The species is carnivorous and in an aquarium setting it will feed on small animal prey like brine shrimp and mysis shrimp.

Etymology
The specific name of this fish honours the ichthyologist Richard Pyle. of the Bishop Museum (Honolulu), who collected type specimen.

References 

Fish described in 1996
Taxa named by Gerald R. Allen
Taxa named by John Ernest Randall 
Fish of Indonesia
Fish of Papua New Guinea
pylei